Phacelia congdonii is a species of phacelia known by the common name Congdon's phacelia. It is endemic to California, where it grows in the Sierra Nevada foothills and the Transverse Ranges. It is a member of the flora in chaparral, woodland, and other local habitat.

It is an annual herb growing mostly upright to a maximum height near 35 centimeters. The branching or unbranched stem is lightly coated in hairs. The oblong leaves are low on the plant and borne on petioles. The hairy inflorescence is a one-sided curving or coiling cyme of many funnel- or bell-shaped flowers. The flower has a lavender or pale purple corolla up to a centimeter wide surrounded by narrow linear hair-lined sepals.

External links
Jepson Manual Treatment
Photo gallery

congdonii
Endemic flora of California
Flora of the Sierra Nevada (United States)
Natural history of the California chaparral and woodlands
Natural history of the Transverse Ranges
Flora without expected TNC conservation status